Ernest George Keegan OAM (16 September 1928 – 25 November 2008) was an Australian politician. He served as an independent member for Newcastle in the New South Wales Legislative Assembly from 19 March 1988 to 3 May 1991.

Keegan attended Adamstown Primary School and Cooks Hill High Schoolfor secondary schooling. Before entering politics, Keegan was a self-employed real estate agent and licensed valuer.

Keegan sought and won by a 5.3% margin the extremely safe Labor party seat of Newcastle at the 1988 New South Wales state election which saw the landslide defeat of the Barrie Unsworth Labor Government which had collectively been in power for well over a decade. He sought re-election at the 1991 New South Wales state election however was defeated by the new Labor candidate.

Keegan had two sons from his first marriage to Laurel Woollett, and at the time of his death was married to Jeanette Ballard and also had two stepdaughters. He was a foundation member of the Newcastle Cruising Yacht Club. Keegan died on 25 November 2008 in the Newcastle suburb of Gateshead, New South Wales after a severe heart attack the week before. His funeral was held at Newcastle's Christ Church Cathedral and was attended by some 700 mourners.

References

 

Members of the New South Wales Legislative Assembly
1928 births
2008 deaths
20th-century Australian politicians